This is a list of some of the cattle breeds considered in the United States to be wholly or partly of American origin. Some may have complex or obscure histories, so inclusion here does not necessarily imply that a breed is predominantly or exclusively American.

References 

 
Livestock
Lists of North American domestic animal breeds